Frederick John Bruckbauer (May 27, 1938 – October 14, 2007) was a relief pitcher in Major League Baseball. He was born in New Ulm, Minnesota.

Bruckbauer was one of the better pitchers in Minnesota Golden Gophers history before making one appearance for the Minnesota Twins during the 1961 season.

In two years with the Gophers, Bruckbauer posted a 16–5 record and received one of the bigger signing bonuses of its time, estimated at $50,000 ($ today), from the original Washington Senators in 1959. That year, he was named Outstanding Rookie of the Three-I League while pitching for the Fox Cities Foxes under Jack McKeon. He had a chance to play in the majors when the Senators moved to Minnesota in 1961, but a shoulder injury had robbed much of his promise. His Major League career, statistically speaking, was only slightly different than that of Eddie Gaedel or Moonlight Graham.

On April 25, 1961, Bruckbauer appeared in a game against the Kansas City Athletics at Municipal Stadium. He faced four batters, allowing three runs on three hits and one walk without recording an out. Coming into the game in the fourth inning in relief of Lee Stange with the Twins already trailing 7–2, Bruckbauer allowed a double to Dick Howser, an RBI single to Jay Hankins, a walk to Jerry Lumpe, and a two-run double to Lou Klimchock. Bruckbauer then departed and his successor, Chuck Stobbs, temporarily stemmed the tide. Kansas City eventually won the contest, 20–2.

When rosters were reduced from 28 to 25 players, he was sent back to the minors and never appeared in another Major League game, making him one of only 19 pitchers in MLB history with a career earned-run average of infinity.

Following his baseball career, Bruckbauer worked for Deere & Company for 34 years. He died in Naples, Florida, at the age of 69.

See also
Cup of coffee

References

External links

Around the Majors
KCA 1961 season

1938 births
2007 deaths
Baseball players from Minnesota
People from New Ulm, Minnesota
Charlotte Hornets (baseball) players
Fox Cities Foxes players
Major League Baseball pitchers
Minnesota Golden Gophers baseball players
Minnesota Twins players
Syracuse Chiefs players
University of Minnesota alumni